Borja Sánchez may refer to:
Borja Sánchez (footballer, born 1978), Spanish football left-back
Borja Sánchez (footballer, born 1987), Spanish football midfielder
Borja Sánchez (footballer, born 1996), Spanish football attacking midfielder